Andrei Ciumac (born 10 September 1985) is a professional tennis player from Moldova. He has been a member of the Moldova Davis Cup team.

Future and Challenger finals

Singles: 2 (0-2)

Doubles: 43 (19–24)

Davis Cup

Singles performances (14–6)

Doubles performances (10-11)

References

External links
 
 
 

Living people
1985 births
Moldovan male tennis players
21st-century Moldovan people